The Southern Integrated Gateway refers to a complex at Bukit Chagar, Johor Bahru, Johor, Malaysia incorporating the city's main railway station, JB Sentral, and a :customs, :immigration, and quarantine complex (CIQ), the Sultan Iskandar Building (Malay: Bangunan Sultan Iskandar), named after Almarhum Sultan Iskandar ibni Almarhum Sultan Ismail of Johor.

The station and complex are the main transportation hub of Johor Bahru and southern Peninsular Malaysia. The Malaysian Public Works Department was responsible for the design and construction of the project; Gerbang Perdana Sdn Bhd was the main contractor. This project is part of the Iskandar Malaysia development corridor project.

The CIQ complex was opened to vehicular traffic on 16 December 2008. , the JB Sentral railway station entered operation and service to the old Johor Bahru railway station ceased.

Benefits of the project
The project sought to improve the traffic flow within Johor Bahru Central Business District. The regional road network was enhanced by the linking of the CIQ complex to the North–South Expressway via the Johor Bahru Inner Ring Road. The project also improved the transportation links between Johor Bahru and Singapore.

The project was intended to also attract Singaporean tourists to Johor Bahru and the rest of Johor because of the improved transportation link, which increases convenience and decreases travelling time.

History

Events

Main components

Sultan Iskandar Building

See also Sultan Iskandar Building

JB Sentral transportation hub

Johor Bahru Sentral railway station or in short form JB Sentral is the transport hub for Johor Bahru, similar to KL Sentral in Kuala Lumpur. The bus station is expected to handle approximately 15,000 bus passengers per hour, reducing traffic congestion at the 20-year-old Larkin Terminal Station. There are 2,000 parking spaces allocated at JB Sentral.

The trains operate in a north–south orientation. The site's western boundary is constrained by the Caltex petrol station abutting the rail track fencing; Jalan Jim Quee to the east has a platform level up to  higher, which slopes to the rail tracks.

The terminal is designed to operate six rail lines and four island platforms on a straight alignment. The JB Sentral building is designed to fit this narrow site by placing the passenger hall and ticketing offices directly above the rail tracks, with escalators and lifts providing access to the rail platforms below.

A pedestrian bridge connects JB Sentral to Johor Bahru City Square the Tun Abdul Razak Complex.

A new station for the Johor Bahru–Singapore Rapid Transit System that connects to the Singapore MRT at Woodlands North will be built at Bukit Chagar located north of JB Sentral by 2024.

Links to other roads

The 250-million-Ringgit, eight-lane, straight elevated permanent link on the originally planned flyover bridge is a main road from the Johor–Singapore Causeway to the new CIQ complex. The old checkpoint for light vehicles, the Tanjung Puteri Customs Complex for heavy vehicles, and the old checkpoint bridge were demolished starting in May 2009.

There is a flyover connecting this project to the Johor Bahru Inner Ring Road and a new highway, the Johor Bahru Eastern Dispersal Link, which links the Southern Integrated Gateway to the interchange of the North–South Expressway Southern Route near Pandan.

The construction of the new Permas Jaya second bridge commenced in 2008.

Critical reception
On its opening day on 16 December 2008, motorists entering Malaysia from Singapore were greeted by a plague of problems such as long queues and traffic confusion. Public transport was also badly affected; some commuters said that crossing the causeway took them almost two hours, rather than 15 minutes as it had with the old checkpoint. (Although the new checkpoint boasts 76 lanes for cars, these 76 lanes split from only one lane that enters the complex. This is because there are only two lanes entering the complex. Of these, one is for cars, and one is for buses and other vehicles.) There was also reportedly a lack of signs and policemen, causing many motorists to get lost within the complex.

In January 2009, a notice issued to pedestrians walking to the customs complex caused confusion among pedestrians and the Singapore custom authorities. Government officials have noted the danger of walking into the customs complex, and proposed a ban on pedestrians. This led to a critical response from pedestrians, who complained of the massive jams that they often faced, as well as noting that the structure of the road leading up to the complex was extremely dangerous and unsuitable for pedestrians. Pedestrians entering Malaysia are required to walk an additional 1 kilometre of arduous uphill terrain after crossing the causeway as the current Sultan Iskandar Building is located further away from the old CIQ Complex which used to be just right after the causeway, thereby bringing the total walking distance to 2 kilometers.

Occupants of the Sultan Iskandar CIQ Complex and JB Sentral 

Department of Immigration Malaysia
Royal Customs Department Malaysia
Malaysian Road Transport Department
PLUS Expressway Berhad
Royal Malaysian Police
Keretapi Tanah Melayu
Veterinary Service Department
Ministry of Home Security Affairs
Malaysian Timber Industrial Board
Malaysian Fisheries Development Authority
Federal Agricultural Marketing Authority
Johor's State Land and Mines Office
Perhilitan
Johor's State Agriculture Department
Johor's State Health Department
Majlis Bandaraya Johor Bahru (MBJB)
Tourism Malaysia

See also
 South Johor Economic Region

References

External links
 JB Sentral KTM Railway Station
 Updates on Johor Bahru CIQ
 Gerbang Perdana

 
2008 establishments in Malaysia
Buildings and structures in Johor
South Johor Economic Region
Transport in Malaysia
Malaysia–Singapore border crossings